Grete Paia (born 27 August 1995) is an Estonian singer and songwriter. She is best known internationally for competing in Eesti Laul 2013 and later in Eesti Laul 2016. She also competed in Eesti Laul 2019 and in Eesti Laul 2022 in a duet with Andrei Zevakin.

Early life
Grete Paia was born on 27 August 1995 in Kuressaare, Estonia on the island of Saaremaa. She attended Kuressaare Gymnasium (Kuressaare Gümnaasium).

Career
On 13 December 2012, Paia was announced as one of the twenty finalists for Eesti Laul 2013 with her Estonian language song "Päästke noored hinged" (Save the souls of the young). She competed in the first semi-final, held on 16 February 2013 and performed in the seventh position. It was revealed that she was not one of the jury's five qualifiers, placing sixth out of ten, but placed first in the public vote and was able to advance to the final, ending in third place.

In the final, held on 2 March 2013, Paia performed in the final position out of ten. She placed fifth with the jury and first with the public and was able to advance to the superfinal, being one of the top two. In the superfinal, she competed against Birgit Õigemeel and her song "Et uus saaks alguse". She lost in the public vote-only superfinal, and placed second behind the winner, Õigemeel.

On 5 November 2015, it was announced that Paia would return to Eesti Laul 2016 with a song called "Stories Untold". She finished 7th place in the final.

On 1 December 2018, it was announced that Paia would participate in Eesti Laul 2019 with her song "Kui isegi kaotan". The song failed to qualify, as despite it finishing in the top 6 in the semi it was not in the top 4 in the jury ranking, nor did it receive enough televotes in the second round of voting.

Paia is competing in Eesti Laul 2022 as a feature artist on Andrei Zevakin's song "Mis nüüd saab", so far they have progressed to the semi final round after qualifying through the televote.

References

Living people
1995 births
People from Kuressaare
21st-century Estonian women singers
Estonian songwriters
Estonian pop singers
Eesti Laul contestants